The Diocese of Kitui may refer to;

Anglican Diocese of Kitui, in the city of Kitui, Kenya
Roman Catholic Diocese of Kitui, in the city of Kitui, Kenya